Pauss is a Norwegian surname. Notable people with the surname include:

 Bernhard Pauss (1839–1907), Norwegian theologian, educator, and author
 Henriette Pauss (1841–1918), Norwegian humanitarian
 Olav Eduard Pauss (1863–1928), Norwegian ship-owner

See also
 Paus

Norwegian-language surnames